The 2009 Afghanistan earthquake was a dip-slip doublet earthquake occurred in eastern Afghanistan, with an initial shock of magnitude of 5.2  at , with a second shock of 5.1  occurring several hours later. The maximum Mercalli intensity was VI (Strong).

Damage
The quakes struck a remote area about 50 miles (90 km) east of Kabul near the Pakistan border. A government representative told AP News that the quakes destroyed 200 mud homes in four villages that had damage that was described as serious.

See also
List of earthquakes in 2009
List of earthquakes in Afghanistan

Notes

Sources 
 
 
 
 .

Afghanistan earthquake
Afghanistan earthquake
2009 04
History of Afghanistan (1992–present)
April 2009 events in Asia
2009 disasters in Afghanistan